Keleshwar Mahadev Temple is a popular temple of the Lord Shiva in the Borao Ka Khera, Rajasthan. There are a couple of temples built on the bank of Gomti River and it is a prominent picnic and tourist destination.

References 

Hindu temples in Rajasthan
Shiva temples in Rajasthan
Mewar
Tourist attractions in Udaipur district